Jean-Pierre Chauveau (born 8 November 1942) is a former member of the Senate of France. He represented the Sarthe department as a member of the Union for a Popular Movement.

References
Page on the Senate website 

1942 births
Living people
French Senators of the Fifth Republic
Union for a Popular Movement politicians
Senators of Sarthe
Place of birth missing (living people)